Thomas Archer (fl. 1415–1417), of Lincoln, was an English politician.

He was elected Mayor of Lincoln for 1416–17 and a Member (MP) of the Parliament of England for Lincoln in 1415 and 1417.

References

14th-century births
15th-century deaths
Members of the Parliament of England (pre-1707) for Lincoln
Mayors of Lincoln, England
English MPs 1415
English MPs 1417